Metacomet (1638 – August 12, 1676), also known as Pometacom, Metacom, and by his adopted English name King Philip, was sachem (elected chief) to the Wampanoag people and the second son of the sachem Massasoit. Metacom became sachem in 1662 when his brother Wamsutta (or King Alexander) died shortly after the death of their father. Wamsutta's widow Weetamoo (d. August 6, 1676),  sachem (a female chief) of the Pocasset, was Metacom's ally and friend for the rest of his life. Metacom married Weetamoo's younger sister Wootonekanuske. It is unclear how many children they had or what happened to them. Wootonekanuske and one of their sons were sold to slavery in the West Indies following the defeat of the Native Americans in what became known as King Philip's War.

Initially, Metacom sought to live in harmony with the colonists. As a sachem, he took the lead in much of his tribes' trade with the colonies. He adopted the European name of Philip, and bought his clothes in Boston, Massachusetts.

The colonies continued to expand. To the west, the Iroquois Confederation also was fighting against neighboring tribes in the Beaver Wars, pushing them from the west and encroaching on Metacom's territory. Finally, in 1671, the colonial leaders of the Plymouth Colony forced major concessions from him. Metacom surrendered much of his tribe's armament and ammunition, and agreed that they were subject to English law. The encroachment continued until hostilities broke out in 1675. Metacom led the opponents of the English, with the goal of stopping Puritan expansion.

Name change
In the spring of 1660 Metacom's brother Wamsutta appeared before the court of Plymouth to request that he and his brother be given English names in accordance with Wampanoag custom, in which new names marked significant moments in time (such as, in this case, Wamsutta's father's death). The court agreed and Wamsutta had his name changed to Alexander, and Metacom's was changed to Philip. Author Nathaniel Philbrick has suggested that the Wampanoag may have taken action at the urging of Wamsutta's interpreter, the Christian neophyte John Sassamon. Metacom was later called "King Philip" by the English.

King Philip's War

King Philip used tribal alliances to coordinate efforts to push European colonists out of New England. Many of the native tribes in the region wanted to push out the colonists following conflicts over land use, diminished game as a consequence of expanding European settlement, and other tensions.

As the colonists brought their growing numbers to bear, King Philip and some of his followers took refuge in the great Assowampset Swamp in southern Massachusetts. He held out for a time, with his family and remaining followers.

Hunted by a group of rangers led by Captain Benjamin Church, King Philip was fatally shot by a praying Indian named John Alderman, on August 12, 1676, in the Miery Swamp near Mount Hope in Bristol, Rhode Island. He was shot by Alderman for killing his brother. After his death, his wife and nine-year-old son were captured and sold as slaves in Bermuda.  Philip's head was mounted on a pike at the entrance to Plymouth, Massachusetts, where it remained for more than two decades.  His body was cut into quarters and hung in trees. Alderman was given Philip's right hand as a trophy.

Representations
 Mary Rowlandson, who was taken captive during a raid on Lancaster, Massachusetts, later wrote a memoir about her captivity, and described meeting with Metacom while she was held by his followers.
 Washington Irving relates a romanticized but sympathetic version of Metacom's life in the 1820 sketch "Philip of Pokanoket," published in his collected stories, The Sketch Book of Geoffrey Crayon, Gent. (1820).
 John Augustus Stone wrote the play, Metamora; or, The Last of the Wampanoags (1829) for the notable actor Edwin Forrest as lead.
 In his short story "The Devil and Daniel Webster" (1937), Stephen Vincent Benét portrays Metacom as a villain to the colonists, and as being killed by a blow to the head (he was shot in the heart). Webster is portrayed as respecting Metacom as one of those who "formed American history." Metacomet, together with other famous historical villains, is a juror in the "trial of the damned". When convinced that his damnation resulted in his loss of admiration for the natural world, he ultimately takes Webster's side against the Devil. In the film he is replaced by Asa, the Black Monk.
 Metacom is featured in the 1995 film The Scarlet Letter as the Wampanoags' new chief after his father's death.
 David Kerr Chivers' Metacomet's War (2008) is an historical novel about King Philip's War.
 Narragansett journalist John Christian Hopkins's novel, Carlomagno, is a historical novel that imagines Metacom's son becoming a pirate after having been sold into slavery in the West Indies.
 The novel "My Father's Kingdom" (2017, by James W. George) focuses on the events leading to King Philip's War.
There is a short section about Metacomet in the Prologue of Tommy Orange’s novel “There There.”

Legacy

Numerous places are named after Metacomet:
 Metacomet Mill in Fall River, Massachusetts, built in 1847 and named for the chief, is the oldest remaining textile mill in the city.
 King Philip Stockade, a large park named after the chief, where the Pocumtuc Indians planned and began the Sack of Springfield, is now a part of Forest Park in Springfield
 King Philip Mills in Fall River, Massachusetts, built 1871
 The USS Metacomet, an 1863 United States Navy ship
 The Metacomet Ridge, a 100-mile long mountain range in southern New England
 The 51-mile Metacomet Trail in central Connecticut
 The 110-mile Metacomet-Monadnock Trail in the Connecticut River Valley of Massachusetts and southern New Hampshire
 Metacomet Country Club, a golf course in East Providence, Rhode Island
 Metacomet Park in Medfield, Massachusetts
 The Metacomet parcel of conservation land within the Black Brook Management Area in Easton, Massachusetts
 Metacom Avenue, a major road running through Bristol and Warren, Rhode Island
 Metacomet Avenues in Ocean Grove and South Deerfield, Massachusetts
 Metacomet Lane in Franklin, Massachusetts
 Metacomet Road in Longmeadow, Massachusetts
 Metacomet Streets in Wrentham, Walpole, and Belchertown, Massachusetts
 Multiple Metacomet street names surrounding the Metacomet Trail in Connecticut
 Mettacomet Path, a street in Harvard, Massachusetts
 Metacomet Drive (improperly designated by the USPS as Metacomet Street) in San Antonio, Texas
 Metacomet Lake, a point of interest in Belchertown, Massachusetts
King Philip Street in Fall River, Massachusetts
 King Philip Regional High School, serving Plainville, Wrentham, and Norfolk, Massachusetts
 King Philip Regional Middle School in Norfolk, Massachusetts, which serves as the middle school for the above three towns
 King Philip Middle School in West Hartford, Connecticut
 King Phillip's Cave in Norton, Massachusetts, a cave said to have been used by the chief as a hiding place towards the end of his reign
 King Philip Mountain, a peak on Talcott Mountain, near Hartford, Connecticut
 King Philip's Hill, on the western bank of the Connecticut River in Northfield, Massachusetts
 King Phillip's Nose, a rock island in the Connecticut River, south of Northfield, Massachusetts
 King Philip's Rock, a historic site situated on a trail in Sharon, Massachusetts
 King Philip's Restaurant in Phillipston, Massachusetts
 King Philip Avenue/Road/Street or Drive in East Providence and Bristol, Rhode Island; Fall River, Longmeadow, Raynham, Somerset, Worcester, and South Deerfield, Massachusetts; and in West Hartford, Connecticut
 King Philip Woods Conservation Land in Sudbury, Massachusetts
 King Philip, the clipper ship built in 1856, is periodically seen at Ocean Beach in San Francisco, California
 Phillips Pond and Phillipswood Road in Sandown, New Hampshire
King Philip Trl Route 202 in Baldwinville, Massachusetts
King Phillip Road, Taunton, MA

One insect species is named after Metacomet:
 Tipula metacomet, a species of large crane fly with a type locality in Amherst, Massachusetts

See also
 Rev William Apess, claimed descent from Metacomet
 List of early settlers of Rhode Island

Footnotes

References
 Bourne, Russel (1990). The Red King's Rebellion. .
 Philbrick, Nathaniel, Mayflower: A Story of Courage, Community, and War. New York: Viking Penguin. .
Tilton, Rev. George Henry. (1918) "A History of Rehoboth, Massachusetts: Its History for 275 Years, 1648–1918." Boston, MA: Published by the author.

External links

 The Royal Gazette article: The struggle to honour Bermuda’s Native American heritage.
 Rootsweb: New England Indians. Bermuda Reconnection Festival 2002 Photo Album.
 Rootsweb: Edward Randolph on the Causes of the King Philip's War (1685).
 Rootsweb: St. David's (Bermuda) Indian Committee.
 Pokanoket/Wampanoag  Constitution. With History.
 US History.com: King Philip's War, 1675–76.
 
 King Philip's Biography

1638 births
1676 deaths
King Philip's War
Native American leaders
Native Americans connected with Plymouth Colony
17th-century Native Americans
People of colonial Rhode Island
Wampanoag people
Native American history of Massachusetts